Trewassa is a hamlet near Davidstow, Cornwall, England, United Kingdom.

References

External links

Hamlets in Cornwall